The boxing competitions at the 2017 Southeast Asian Games in Kuala Lumpur took place at MATRADE Exhibition and Convention Centre in Segambut.

The 2017 Games featured competitions in six events (all events for men).

Men's light flyweight

Finals

Top half

Bottom half

Men's flyweight

Top half

Bottom half

Men's bantamweight

Finals

Top half

Bottom half

Men's light welterweight

Finals

Top half

Bottom half

Men's middleweight

Finals

Top half

Bottom half

Men's light heavyweight

Finals

Top half

Bottom half

References

External links
  

R